Urban East Norwegian, also known as Standard East Norwegian, is a Norwegian standard language traditionally spoken in the cities and among the elites of Eastern Norway, which is today the main spoken language of Oslo, its surrounding metropolitan area and throughout much of Eastern Norway. In Eastern Norway, Urban East Norwegian is generally accepted as the de facto spoken standard of Bokmål/Riksmål. 

Urban East Norwegian has linguistic roots in Danish—specifically the Eastern Norwegian elites' pronunciation of Danish (Dano-Norwegian), traditionally known as Educated Norwegian. The traditional linguistic divide between East Scandinavian and West Scandinavian runs right through Eastern Norway, which was partially ruled by Danish kings in the Middle Ages. Additionally, while influenced to a degree by the traditional spoken dialects of Eastern Norway, Urban East Norwegian is strongly influenced by the written Danish language. It is markedly different from the traditional Norwegian dialects in Eastern Norway, including Oslo, with which it has co-existed for centuries. Until the 20th century, Urban East Norwegian was spoken by the educated middle and upper class, while the working class and the farmer population spoke traditional dialects, that came to be seen as working-class sociolects in Oslo. In Oslo and other parts of central Eastern Norway Urban East Norwegian has largely displaced traditional dialects since the 20th century.

History
As of 2000, Urban East Norwegian was the most commonly taught variety of Norwegian to foreign students.

Phonology

References

Bibliography

 

Norwegian dialects
Norwegian language